Princess Isabella of Bavaria (Marie Elisabeth Luise Amalie Elvire Blanche Eleonore; 31 August 1863 – 26 February 1924) was the third child and eldest daughter of Prince Adalbert of Bavaria and his wife Infanta Amalia of Spain. By her marriage to Prince Tommaso, Duke of Genoa, she became referred to as the Duchess of Genoa.

Family

Isabella was one of five children born to Prince Adalbert of Bavaria and his wife Infanta Amalia of Spain.

Isabella's father Adalbert was the fourth son of Ludwig I of Bavaria and Therese of Saxe-Hildburghausen. Her mother Amalia was a daughter of Infante Francisco de Paula of Spain, a younger brother of Ferdinand VII of Spain. Her mother was also a sister of Francis, Duke of Cádiz, the consort of Ferdinand VII's daughter Isabella II of Spain.

Marriage and children
On April 14, 1883 at Nymphenburg, Bavaria, Isabella married Prince Tommaso, Duke of Genoa. He was the only son of Prince Ferdinando, Duke of Genoa and his wife Princess Elisabeth of Saxony. He was also a brother-in-law through his sister Margherita of Savoy of Umberto I of Italy, and thus was an uncle of the future King Victor Emmanuel III of Italy. Their union was the fourth time the houses of Wittelsbach and Savoy had been united in marriage.

The wedding was regarded by one spectator as "remarkable for good taste and simplicity". Ludwig II of Bavaria (Isabella's cousin) did not attend, as he rarely went to public events. His absence, observed one attendee, meant that the wedding guests "could enjoy themselves in an atmosphere of conviviality which is rarely found in Court festivities".

Isabella and Tommaso had the following children:

Later life
In 1905, Isabella and her husband, as well as other members of the House of Savoy attended a ceremony in honor of the beatification of a French priest. It was attended by Pope Pius X, along with 1,000 French pilgrims and several thousand worshipers of other nationalities, as well as twenty-two Cardinals and the Papal Court. The event was notable as it was the first time members of the House of Savoy had assisted at a religious function in the presence of the Pope.

As Duke and Duchess of Genoa, Isabella and her husband often attended other royal functions as representatives of the House of Savoy. For instance, in 1911 they attended the unveiling of a large monument of Victor Emmanuel II of Italy in Rome. The event had nearly one million witnesses, and was also attended by dowager queens Maria Pia of Portugal and Margherita of Italy and the Duke and Duchess of Aosta.

In 1913, Isabella had a near escape from death. While anointing her arms and neck with a preparation for rheumatism, she became too close to a lamp, causing the preparation to ignite. She only survived because her maid quickly smothered the flames.

Death
On 26 February 1924, Isabella died of bronchial pneumonia in Rome. She had been ill for several days beforehand. Tommaso would die seven years later, in 1931.

Ancestry

References

1863 births
1924 deaths
Burials at the Basilica of Superga
Bavarian princesses
Italian princesses
Duchesses of Genoa
House of Wittelsbach
Princesses of Savoy
Nobility from Munich